Robert Petersen may refer to:

Robert Storm Petersen (1882–1949), Danish cartoonist
Robert E. Petersen (1926–2007), American publisher and automotive museum founder
Robert Petersen (speed skater) (1914–2000), American Olympic speed skater

See also
Robert Peterson (disambiguation)